Sula Matovu (born 17 July 1992) is a Ugandan soccer player, who plays as a striker and midfielder for Al-Orouba SC in the Oman Professional League and the Ugandan national team.

Club career

Early career
Matovu started his playing career while still in school before joining Proline FC soccer academy in 2007. While at the academy he showed remarkable ability and great performance and joined Nalubaale Buikwe in Uganda Super League. After one season he joined Proline FC where he scored regularly in Uganda Super League due to his great technique, burst of speed as he takes off opponents, accurate shooting and ball crossing, good and close ball control, dribbling and passing as well as nice displays in soccer matches enticed the Uganda national football team coach Bobby Williamson who called him for Uganda national football team. He has also featured for U20 Uganda national football team and U23 Uganda national football team.

Saint George F.C (Loan)
In January 2011, Matovu moved to Ethiopian club Saint George F.C. coached by Giuseppe Dossena on a 6 months loan deal.

Erbil SC
In August 2012, Matovu completed a one-year move to Erbil SC. Matovu made his Erbil S.C debut after coming as a substitute in the 76th min in a 5–1 win over Malaysian Kelantan F.C in the Asian Quarter Final 1st Leg in Erbil city on 18 September 2012.
On 25 September 2012, in the 2nd Leg of Asian Quarter Final, Matovu scored his Erbil SC a debut goal in 37th min in a 1–1 draw with Kelantan ensuring Erbil S.C advance to the Asian Semi-finals. On 3 November 2012, he came as a substitute on the 46th min in the Asian Cup Final against Al Kuwait and Erbil S.C went on to lose 4–0.
On 24 November 2012, Matovu scored his Iraq-Kurdish league debut goal in the 7th min in the 3–2 win over Al Sulimaniya.

BK Häcken
After an impressive season with Iraq side Erbil SC, Swedish Allsvenskan side BK Häcken invited him for 3 weeks trials where he impressed the technical team and becoming the fastest player in the club history and was signed. He scored his first goal for BK Häcken in a 3–1 win against FC Dallas in a preseason match and ever since he has remained an impressive figure for the Gothenburg based side BK Häcken.

Kaizer Chiefs
After spending 2014 with Swedish Allsvenskan side BK Häcken, he was linked with a move to South African Premier Soccer League side Kaizer Chiefs on 20 June 2015. He started training with Kaizer Chiefs on 24 June 2015 and later signed a six-month deal on the 8 July 2015. Sula Scored the fourth goal in 4–0 win against Volcan de Moroni of Comoros in 2016 CAF Champions League

Honours

Club
Erbil SC
AFC Cup Runners-up: 2012
St. George FC
Ethiopian Premier League: 2011–12
 Champion : 2011–12.
Ethiopian Cup: 2011
 Champion :

Country
Uganda
CECAFA Cup: 2011
Uganda-U20
CECAFA U-20 Championship: 2010

References

External links 

Sula Matovu at Footballdatabase

Living people
1992 births
Ugandan footballers
Ugandan expatriate footballers
Association football midfielders
Association football forwards
Erbil SC players
BK Häcken players
Najaf FC players
Kaizer Chiefs F.C. players
Royal Eagles F.C. players
Proline FC players
South African Premier Division players
Ugandan expatriate sportspeople in Ethiopia
Ugandan expatriate sportspeople in Iraq
Ugandan expatriate sportspeople in Sweden
Ugandan expatriate sportspeople in South Africa
Expatriate footballers in Ethiopia
Expatriate footballers in Iraq
Expatriate footballers in Sweden
Expatriate soccer players in South Africa
Expatriate footballers in Uganda
Expatriate footballers in Oman
Uganda international footballers